The Islands Voyage, also known as the Essex-Raleigh Expedition, was an ambitious, but unsuccessful naval campaign sent by Queen Elizabeth I of England, and supported by the United Provinces, against the Spanish Empire and Portuguese Empire of Philip II from the House of Habsburg during the Anglo–Spanish War (1585–1604) and the Eighty Years' War.

Campaign
The campaign took place between June and late August 1597, and the objectives were to destroy the Spanish fleet of the Adelantado of Castile, Martín de Padilla y Manrique, Count of Santa Gadea, at the port of Ferrol, occupy and destroy the Spanish possessions in the Azores Islands, and intercept the Spanish treasure fleet coming from America as it passed through the Azores. The result of the campaign was a great failure for England. It was led by Sir Robert Devereux, Earl of Essex, as Admiral and General-in-chief, Sir Thomas Howard, Earl of Suffolk, as Vice-Admiral, and Sir Walter Raleigh as Rear-Admiral. The Dutch squadron was commanded by Lieutenant-Admiral Jacob van Wassenaer Duivenvoorde. Other notable participants were Sir Henry Wriothesley, Earl of Southampton (who commanded the galleon Garland), the Baron Jacob Astley of Reading, Sir Edward Michelborne aboard the Moon, Sir Robert Mansell, Roger Manners 5th Earl of Rutland, and the English poet John Donne.

The Anglo-Dutch fleet returned to England with great losses and a war of recriminations between Essex and Raleigh. The Spanish fleets were led by Martín de Padilla, Alonso de Bazán, Diego Brochero and Pedro de Zubiaur. The treasure fleet was commanded by Admiral Juan Gutiérrez de Garibay.

The expedition was the last major naval campaign of Elizabeth I of England. Essex's failure to capture the silver of the Spanish treasure fleet, and his failure to occupy the Portuguese Azores Islands (Iberian Union), contributed to his decline in the queen's favour.

See also
 Adelantado
 Master-General of the Ordnance
 Franco-Spanish War (1595–1598)

Notes

References
 Edwards, Edward. The Life of Sir Walter Ralegh: Life. Vol. I. MacMillan & Co. London. 1868.
 Hanes, Laura. The Career of the Earl of Essex from the Islands Voyage in 1597 to His Execution in 1610. University of Pennsylvania. Philadelphia. 1923.
 Heywood, Thomas. The Fair Maid of the West: Parts I and II. University of Nebraska Press. 1967.
 Jowitt, Claire. The Culture of Piracy, 1580-1630: Literature and Seaborne Crime. Ashgate. 
 Rowse, A.L.. The Expansion of Elizabethan England. First published in 1955. 
 Thomas M McCoog, S.J. The Society of Jesus in Ireland, Scotland, and England, 1589-1597. Printed in Great Britain by the MPG Books Group. 
 Wagner, John A. Encyclopedia of Tudor England. Library of Congress Cataloging-in-Publication Data. 
 Whittemore, Hank. The Monument: By Edward de Vere, 17th Earl of Oxford. London. 1609.

External links
Hanes, Laura. The Career of the Earl of Essex from the Islands Voyage in 1597 to His Execution in 1610. University of Pennsylvania. Philadelphia. 1923.

Conflicts in 1597
Naval battles of the Anglo-Spanish War (1585–1604)
Naval battles of the Eighty Years' War
Naval battles involving Spain
Naval battles involving England
Naval battles involving the Dutch Republic
1597 in the British Empire
Eighty Years' War (1566–1609)
16th-century military history of Spain